Sase  is a village in the municipality of Višegrad, Bosnia and Herzegovina.As of 1991 it had a population of 99 people, of which 54% were ethnic Serbs. The village lies in a gorge of the Drina River.

References

Populated places in Višegrad